Aero León S.A de C.V was a cargo airline based in Mexico City.

History
Aero León was originally founded in 1951 by the captain Eucario León, a former fighter pilot of the Mexico Air force, starting with a Tri pacer PA-22 on flights between Tehuacan, Usila Oaxaca, and Teutila Oaxaca in 1951 and formally calling the airline Aeroleon in 1978.

In March 1980, Aero León received two Douglas DC-8-24 planes and started flights to Central and South America.

Aeroleon started as a bush operation in 1951 and by 1983 was named the greatest Gates Learjet sales representative in the world after it sold 32 aircraft in one single year. 

Captain Leon had an accident in 1984 also which left him paralytic and had to close the airline in 1985 bye 1992 he returns into the cargo business again with a new airline LAMCASA (Linea Aerea Mexicana de Carga) with Convair 340, A300 and 727-200 which operated from 1994 till 2004 when captain Leon lost his battle against brain cancer.

In April 1983, Aero León had an incident while it was carrying cattle to Brazil. The aircraft (a DC-8)was depressurized and had an emergency landing due to a bull that set free from his cage in flight. After landing, the cattle were found dead, due to the temperature descending to subfreezing levels by the depressurization; the crew was called the greatest bullfighters.

Destinations
Until March 1983, destinations of Aero León included:
Mexico City
Toluca
Monterrey
San Luis Potosi
Guadalajara
Cancún
Buenos Aires
Manaus
Rio de Janeiro
Caracas

Fleet
1 Douglas DC-8-21F
1 Douglas DC-8-24F
2 Douglas DC-9-15F
1 Fairchild Metroliner (used only as crew trainer)

References

Defunct airlines of Mexico
Defunct cargo airlines
Airlines established in 1978
Airlines disestablished in 1983
Cargo airlines of Mexico
Mexican companies established in 1978